is a Japanese actress represented by Oscar Promotion.

Biography
Yokoyama graduated from Tokyo Metropolitan Takehaya Senior High School and Aoyama Gakuin University Faculty of Letters Second Section of the Department of Education. While part of the land division of high school, she was part of Queen Bee, a copy band to the Barbee Boys and Men's Meg (from the brands Men's Viki and Megumi no Megu), a copy to Ann Lewis.

Yokoyama made her debut as Rei, the girlfriend of Jun (played by Hidetaka Yoshioka) in  Kita no Kuni kara '87 Hatsukoi, and has been active in a wide range of dramas, advertisements and variety shows afterwards. She is mostly known for playing the heroine Ruriko in Shinju Fujin in 2002.

In 1995, Yokoyama married advert narrator Yasuki Okawa, but due to her popularity in Shinju Fujin she became busy and they divorced in December 2002 due to married couplings. In May 2006, she later married American Express Vice President Mamoru Ninobu.

In September 2008, Yokoyama moved to Oscar Promotion from Knockout.

It was undisputed that she was a heavy drinker. Yokoyama dislikes narcissists. She especially "hated" men who are muscular and drunk on their bodies, she had said in a variety show.

Her brother is former professional boxer Tomohiko Yokoyama.

Filmography

TV dramas

Films

Stage

Other TV programmes

Advertisements

References

External links
 on be amie 
 on Oscar Promotion 

Actresses from Tokyo
1969 births
Living people